Ray Lawrence (born 1948) is an Australian film director, best known for his 2001 film Lantana.

Overview
All his films are made in Australia with predominantly Australian casts. He has made only three films in nearly four decades, yet they have been some of the most critically acclaimed works in Australian cinema during that time. He is famous for his one-take shoots and use of natural light. He makes commercials in between films.

Early life
Lawrence was born in London, England, the son of a painter who painted the royal coaches at Buckingham Palace, and later spray painted London buses for double the salary. He moved to Australia with his family in 1958 at age 11 and they settled in Victor Harbor, South Australia after spending three years in a migrant hostel in Gawler. When he left school he moved to Sydney and began working in advertising. He worked for a number of years in London producing commercials. Then he returned home, established Window Productions with Glen Thomas, and became one of Australia's top directors of TV commercials.

Career
Lawrence's unique cinematic style has established him as one of the most respected dramatic directors of contemporary Australian cinema.  While only producing three films in his 25-year career as a feature film director, all of his features have meditated around the slippery and often painful nature of 'real' human interaction. It is Lawrence's ability to illustrate intensely personal interactions between characters as they navigate through the less than 'cinematic' terrain of real life situations that has engaged his audience and earned the respect among cinema goers and critics alike.

His second feature, Lantana (2001), is one of the highest grossing Australian films ever made winning critical and popular recognition including Best film, Australian Film Institute (AFI) Awards.  Examining human relationships and the notion of trust, the film weaves the mysterious disappearance of a wealthy psychiatrist across the fabric of three Australian families, with each family representative of a different social class existent in contemporary Australian society.

Private life
His son, Ben Lawrence, is also a film director.

Filmography
 Bliss (1985), based on the Peter Carey novel of  the same name
 Lantana (2001), Andrew Bovell's adaptation of his play, Speaking In Tongues, which won seven AFI Awards
 Jindabyne (2006), based on Raymond Carver's short story, So Much Water So Close to Home

References

External links

1948 births
Living people
Australian film directors
English emigrants to Australia
Film directors from London